Adarsh Singh is an Indian sport shooter who competes in the 25 meter rapid fire pistol and 10 meter air pistol. He won a silver and a silver at the ISSF World Cup 2021(New Delhi) in the 25m Rapid Fire Men Team Event. He has also won Gold at South Asian Games 2019 and Bronze at Asian Shooting Championship the same year.

References

External links
 Profile at ISSF

Living people
Indian male sport shooters
2001 births
21st-century Indian people